The molecular formula C7H13NO4 (molar mass: 175.18 g/mol, exact mass: 175.0845 u) may refer to:

 Valienamine
 EGLU

Molecular formulas